The Logon or Logone River is a major tributary of the Chari River. The Logone's sources are located in the western Central African Republic, northern Cameroon, and southern Chad.  It has two major tributaries: the Pendé River (Eastern Logone) in the prefecture Ouham-Pendé in the Central African Republic and the Mbéré River (Western Logone) at the east of Cameroon.  Many swamps and wetlands surround the river.

Settlements on the river include Kousseri, Cameroon's northernmost city, and Chad's capital city, N'Djaména, which is located at the spot where the Logone empties into the Chari River.

The Logone forms part of the international border between Chad and Cameroon.

Hydrometry
The Bongor observed average annual flow during this period was  fed by an area of about  approximately 94.5% of the total catchment area of the River. Due to the strong evaporation, the amount of water flowing into the estuary decreases.

Population 
In the eastern lower Logone valley formed out of the Kotoko population several historic sultanates (Kousseri, Logone-Birni, Makari-Goulfey and others) which were vassals of the Bornu or Baguirmi inside the borders of modern-day Cameroon.

History 
In Chad, the administrative regions Logone Oriental and Logone Occidental named after the river. Ober-Logone was an administrative district of the German colony of Cameroon.

September 2013 dam failure and flood 
On the night of September 17 to September 18, 2013, heavy rains caused a rupture of the dam along the Logone River at the town of Dougui, Kai Kai District in the Far North Region of Cameroon. This caused initial evacuations of people to the banks of the dam. On September 27, a second rupture in the dam  from the first rupture started flooding the area and nearly 9,000 people were displaced.

References

 
Rivers of Cameroon
Rivers of Chad
Ramsar sites in Chad
Chari River
International rivers of Africa
Lake Chad
Lake Fianga
Cameroon–Chad border
Dam failures in Africa
2013 disasters in Africa